"The Way Life's Meant to Be" is a song written by Jeff Lynne and performed by Electric Light Orchestra (ELO). The single peaked at number 30 on the German Media Control Singles Chart.

"The Way Life's Meant to Be" was the first song recorded for Time, a few months before the main recording sessions.  The song is track five on the 1981 album Time and was the last track to be released as a single from the album in the UK. It starts with gentle violins, and continues with flamenco-like guitar playing, and castanets. The south Mediterranean sound continues throughout the vocal and choiring on the refrain. Continuing the theme of time travel, the lyrics deal with the protagonist's Future Shock at seeing his town over a hundred years later, and his disappointment at how the future is not nearly as utopian as the people of 1981, himself included, had predicted.

It was the first single since "Nightrider" in 1976 that failed to chart in the UK. The B-side was "Wishing" taken from the Discovery album. The song was recorded at the Polar Studios in Stockholm, unlike the majority of the songs of the album that were recorded at Musicland Studios in Munich.

According to ELO drummer Bev Bevan, the castanets and acoustic guitars in layers were intended to give the song a Phil Spectorish wall of sound feel.

References

1981 songs
1982 singles
Electric Light Orchestra songs
Song recordings produced by Jeff Lynne
Songs written by Jeff Lynne
Jet Records singles